Parizh (lit. "Paris") is the name of several rural localities in Russia.

Modern localities
Parizh, Republic of Bashkortostan, a village in Nizhnekiginsky Selsoviet of Kiginsky District in the Republic of Bashkortostan
Parizh, Chelyabinsk Oblast, a selo in Parizhsky Selsoviet of Nagaybaksky District in Chelyabinsk Oblast

Alternative names
Parizh, alternative name of Charyshsky, a settlement in Krasnoshchyokovsky Selsoviet of Krasnoshchyokovsky District in Altai Krai;

See also
Paris (disambiguation)